Timburi is a municipality in the state of São Paulo in Brazil. The population is 2,652 (2020 est.) in an area of 197 km². The elevation is 838 m.

References

Municipalities in São Paulo (state)